The non-marine molluscs of Senegal are a part of the molluscan fauna of Senegal (wildlife of Senegal).

A number of species of non-marine molluscs are found in the wild in Senegal.

Freshwater gastropods 
Freshwater gastropods in Senegal include:

Viviparidae
 Bellamya unicolor Olivier, 1804

Cochliopidae
 Heleobia sp.

Thiaridae
 Melanoides tuberculata Müller, 1774

Planorbidae
 Biomphalaria pfeifferi (Krauss, 1848)
 Bulinus forskalii (Ehrenberg, 1831)
 Bulinus truncatus (Audouin, 1827)

Lymnaeidae
 Radix natalensis Krauss, 1848

Land gastropods 
Land gastropods in Senegal include:

Freshwater bivalves
Freshwater bivalves in Senegal include:

Unionidae
 Coelatura aegyptiaca (Cailliaud, 1827)

Corbiculidae
 Corbicula fluminalis (Müller 1774)

See also
 List of marine molluscs of Senegal

Lists of molluscs of surrounding countries:
 List of non-marine molluscs of Mauritania, Wildlife of Mauritania
 List of non-marine molluscs of Mali, Wildlife of Mali
 List of non-marine molluscs of Guinea, Wildlife of Guinea
 List of non-marine molluscs of Guinea-Bissau, Wildlife of Guinea-Bissau
 List of non-marine molluscs of Gambia, Wildlife of Gambia

References

Further reading 
 Dautzenberg P. (1890). "Récoltes malacologiques de M. le Capitaine Em. Dorr dans le Haut-Sénégal et le Soudan francais de 1886 à1889". Mémoires de la Société zoologique de France 3: 128-135.
 Diaw O. T., Vassiliades G., Seye M. & Sarr Y. (1990). "Prolifération de mollusques et incidence sur les trématodoses du Delta du fleuve Sénégal et du lac de Guiers après la construction du barrage de Diama sur le fleuve Sénégal". Revue d’Élevage et de Médecine vétérinaire des pays tropicaux 43: 499-502.
 

M

Molluscs
Senegal
Senegal